Eden Hindu Hostel, established in 1886, was primarily built for Hindu students of Presidency University, Kolkata, India. The hostel is now open for students of all religions. It is now meant for students who come from outside Calcutta to study in the Presidency University, Kolkata. The hostel is located next to Darbhanga Building inside Ashutosh Sikhsha Prangan of the University of Calcutta and stands on Peary Charan Sarkar Street, which separates Presidency University from the premises of the main campus of the University of Calcutta. As of 13 November 2014, this hostel has the capacity to accommodate 275 boarders.

Buildings and rooms

The building was built out of funds raised by Ashley Eden and the architect was W.B. Gwyther and the contractor was Rai Khetter Chunder Bannerjee. There are 6 blocks called the "Ward" in the hostel. Five of them are in the old building and one as a new construction. The north wing of the old building (adjacent to P.C Sarkar St.) is two storied comprising wards I and II whereas the east wing (adjacent to CU campus) is three storied comprising wards III, IV and V. This is an old styled building with two huge wooden staircases.

The hostel has eight guest-rooms having the rental charges of 60 to 100 a day. Parents of the students as well as guests of the college are allowed to stay.

Staff 
The staff pattern includes one Superintendent, two Assistant Superintendents, three Stewards, four office staff, five kitchen staff and six additional temporary members of kitchen staff for smooth running of the hostel. There are staff quarters for superintendent, assistant superintendents, stewards and other staff members within the hostel premises.

Canteens
The hostel staff run and operate three canteens in hostel.

Activities
All the boarders actively participate in sports tournaments like football, volleyball, cricket, etc. They also take part in various cultural activities like Saraswati Puja, Re-union, Freshers’ Welcome and outgoing boarders’ farewell, Ward tour and other cultural programmes.

Notable alumni
Sukhamoy Chakravarty
Meghnad Saha
Binay Majumdar 
Rajendra Prasad
Amartya Sen
Satyabrata Mookherjee

References

External links
Presidency alumni (archived)
Presidency College (archived)
Hindu Hostel (archived)

Halls of residence in Kolkata
Presidency University, Kolkata
1886 establishments in India
Residential buildings completed in 1886